Weewanie Hot Springs Provincial Park is a provincial park in British Columbia, Canada, located on the east bank of Devastation Channel opposite the north end of Hawkesbury Island, in the Gardner Canal region south of Kitimat on the province's North Coast.

History

Baths were built at these hot springs by A.A. Creed, Commodore of the Kitimat Yacht Club, for the benefit of travellers, and a preserve set aside by the provincial government.  The site was created as a Class A provincial park in May 2004.

Name origin

The name derives from that of nearby Weewanie Creek, which is to the south of the hotsprings.  "Weewanie" is an adaptation of a Haisla word meaning "many creeks".  The spring's traditional uses by the Haisla are hygienic, medicinal, ritual and recreational.

Access
Access is by boat only.

See also
List of hot springs
List of British Columbia provincial parks

References

Haisla
Provincial parks of British Columbia
Hot springs of British Columbia
North Coast of British Columbia